Helophilus lapponicus is a species of syrphid fly in the family Syrphidae. It is found in Europe.

References

Eristalinae
Articles created by Qbugbot
Insects described in 1844
Taxa named by Peter Fredrik Wahlberg
Hoverflies of North America
Diptera of Europe